Streptomyces shenzhenensis is a bacterium species from the genus of Streptomyces which has been isolated from mangrove soil in Shenzhen in China.

See also 
 List of Streptomyces species

References

Further reading

External links
Type strain of Streptomyces shenzhenensis at BacDive -  the Bacterial Diversity Metadatabase	

shenzhenensis
Bacteria described in 2012